Jazz Impressions of the U.S.A. is a studio album by Dave Brubeck Quartet.

Track listing
All tracks composed by Dave Brubeck
 "Ode to a Cowboy" – 5:02
 "Summer Song" – 6:06
 "Yonder for Two" – 5:00
 "History of a Boy Scout" – 4:33
 "Plain Song" – 4:04
 "Curtain Time" – 4:46
 "Sounds of the Loop" – 7:29
 "Home at Last" – 3:52

Personnel
The Dave Brubeck Quartet
Dave Brubeck - piano
Paul Desmond - alto saxophone
Joe Morello - drums
Norman Bates - bass
Technical
Arnold Roth - artwork

References

Dave Brubeck albums
1957 albums
Fantasy Records albums